Parliamentary elections were held in Hungary between 2 and 9 October 1901. The result was a victory for the Liberal Party, which won 277 of the 413 seats.

Results

Parliamentary
Hungary
Elections in Hungary
Elections in Austria-Hungary
Hungary

hu:Magyarországi országgyűlési választások a dualizmus korában#1901